Loukas Louka may refer to:

 Loukas Louka (footballer) (born 1978), Cypriot football defender
 Loukas Louka (shot putter) (born 1945), retired Greek Cypriot shot putter